British pair Jamie Baker and James Ward were the defending champions, but Baker didn't participate this year.
As a result, Ward played alongside Tomislav Perić. They reached the semifinals and were eliminated by Rik de Voest and Izak van der Merwe.
de Voest and van der Merwe went on to win the tournament after beating Sekou Bangoura and Jesse Witten 6–3, 6–3 in the final

Seeds

Draw

Draw

References
 Doubles Draw
 Qualifying Draw

Savannah Challenger - Doubles
2011 Doubles